Uschi Freitag (born 19 August 1989) is a German-Dutch female diver. Until 2012 she represented Germany at international competitions, and since 2013 the Netherlands.

She has a German father. She competed at for Germany at the 2011 World Aquatics Championships and later for the Netherlands at the 2013 and 2015 World Aquatics Championships. Her first international medal was at the 2011 European Diving Championships where she won together with the German Katja Dieckow the bronze medal in the 3 m springboard synchro event. A year later at the 2012 European Aquatics Championships they won again the bronze medal in the synchro event.

Both at the 2012 European Aquatics Championships (representing Germany) and 2016 European Aquatics Championships (representing the Netherlands) she won the silver medal in the 3 m springboard event.

She participated in the 2016 Summer Olympics.

See also
Netherlands at the 2015 World Aquatics Championships

References

External links
FINA
Swimswam
Zimbio
Getty Images

Dutch female divers
Living people
Place of birth missing (living people)
1989 births

German female divers
Divers at the 2016 Summer Olympics
Olympic divers of the Netherlands
Sportspeople from Maastricht
Dutch people of German descent